Message to Our Folks is a 1969 album by the Art Ensemble of Chicago recorded in Paris for the French BYG Actuel label. It features performances by Lester Bowie, Joseph Jarman, Roscoe Mitchell and Malachi Favors Maghostut.

Track listing
 "Old-Time Religion" - 7:41
 "Dexterity" (Parker) - 4:05
 "Rock Out" - 8:36
 "A Brain For The Seine" (Art Ensemble of Chicago) 20:17
All compositions by Roscoe Mitchell except as indicated
Recorded August 12, 1969 in Paris

Personnel
Lester Bowie: trumpet, percussion instruments
Malachi Favors Maghostut: bass, percussion instruments, vocals
Joseph Jarman: saxophones, clarinets, percussion instruments
Roscoe Mitchell: saxophones, clarinets, flute, percussion instruments

References 

1969 albums
BYG Actuel albums
Art Ensemble of Chicago albums